Sven Nys (born 17 June 1976) is a former professional cyclist competing in cyclo-cross and mountain bike. With two world championships, seven world cups, and over 140 competitive victories, he is considered one of the best cyclo-cross racers of his generation, and remains a prominent figure in cyclo-cross. Apart from cyclo-cross, Nys is also fivefold national mountainbike champion, and has competed in that discipline in two Olympic games.

Career overview

Early years
Born in Bonheiden, Belgium, Nys began racing BMX at the age of 8. He won eight BMX national titles before switching to cyclocross, a more popular sport in Belgium. He won the under-23 world championship in 1997 and 1998, beating another Belgian, Bart Wellens. Nys moved to the elite category in 1998–1999, joining the Dutch  team.

Becoming elite
In the elite class he won the Superprestige competition and came third in the national championships. The next season, he won the Superprestige again, ended the World Cup as leader and became Belgian champion. This made him favourite for the 2000 world championship. But his Rabobank management told him not to beat his teammate, the Dutchman Richard Groenendaal. Groenendaal sprinted away from the start and Nys was forced to hold back and not help another Belgian, Mario De Clercq, chase him. Groenendaal won and Nys, who came third, was criticised in Belgium for choosing team over country. The Royal Belgian Cycling League demanded an explanation. It became more forgiving but the head coach, Erik De Vlaeminck, remained unconvinced.

Nys blamed an injury for not winning a season-long competition or championship in 2000–2001. A year later he won the World Cup and the Superprestige again. In the world championships that year he came third after being outsprinted by De Clercq and Tom Vannoppen. The following season Nys won the Superprestige for the fourth time as well as the Gazet van Antwerpen trophy for a first time. He became Belgian champion again, but Wellens won the world championship and the World Cup.

Wellens dominated 2003–2004. Nys' chance for the World Cup ended when other Belgians sprinted past him, taking points. Nys was angry that his countrymen had allowed Groenendaal, a Dutchman, to win the World Cup rather than him. That evening Nys decided from then on to ride for himself.

The cannibal

Nys won everything of importance and at the end of 2004–2005 won the national and world championships, ended number one in the UCI rankings and World Cup, the Superprestige and the Gazet van Antwerpen Trophy. He is the only cyclo-crosser to achieve such dominance. Nys came close to repeating the feat the following season but he gave up in the world championship after a fall on the last lap.

Nys won all eight Superprestige races in 2006–2007. In the Superprestige he won 13 races from Hoogstraten in 2005 to Asper Gaver in 2007. That season he won the World Cup and the Gazet van Antwerpen trophy again, but neither the national or world championship. The national involved a lot of running, not Nys' talent, and were won by Wellens. At the world championship in Hooglede-Gits Nys fell three times: over Wellens, who fell because a television motor had hit one of the road markers; over Erwin Vervecken; and because of an error of his own. He finished 11th.

The following season, Nys won the World Cup, the Superprestige and the Gazet van Anterwerpen trophy again. He also won his fifth national championship. The Dutchman Lars Boom became champion of the world and Zdeněk Štybar took the silver, both barely 22 at the time. Nys, already nearing 32, came third.

Nys switched teams from Rabobank to Landbouwkrediet-Tönissteiner. Niels Albert, 2008's U23 world champion, joined the elite category that season, giving Nys another opponent. But Nys won all the season-long competitions and the national championship. Albert won the world championship, Štybar was second and Nys third. The Belgian press referred to Albert, Štybar and Nys as De Grote Drie (The Big Three), it was clear that Nys' years of absolute domination were behind him.

In his second mountain bike race Nys won the Belgian championship and then came ninth at the Olympic Games in 2008. On 31 December 2006 Nys won his 150th race with the elites, at Diegem. Four years later, he scored his 300th career win at the Koppenbergcross, one of the toughest races in the season.

Nys was appointed as a member of the inaugural UCI Athletes' Commission in 2011.

In 2013 Nys won the world championship a second time. He said his career was now complete.

On 10 February 2013, Nys won his 60th race in the Superprestige.

On 22 November 2015, Nys won the Koksijde round of the UCI Cyclo-cross World Cup in Belgium, his fiftieth victory in the series. His win came seventeen years and a day after his first World Cup victory.

Sven Nys called a halt to his career on 5–6 March 2016 at an event called "Merci Sven" which was held at the Antwerp Sportpaleis (Belgium).

Post cycling career
After ending his active cyclocross career Nys bought the cyclocross team Telenet–Fidea Lions of which he is the general manager. He is also a motivational speaker, during his keynotes he shares information about his experiences during his cycling career.

Major results

Cyclo-cross

1996–1997
 1st  UCI World Under-23 Championships
1997–1998
 1st  UCI World Under-23 Championships
1998–1999 (13)
 UCI World Cup
1st Tábor
 1st Overall Superprestige
1st Ruddervoorde
1st Sint-Michielsgestel
1st Gieten
1st Sivelle
1st Diegem
1st Wetzikon
 1st Eeklo
 1st Zonnebeke
1999–2000 (21)
 1st  National Championships
 1st  Overall UCI World Cup
1st Safenwill
1st Leudelange
 1st Overall Superprestige
1st Ruddervoorde
1st Gieten
1st Silvelle
1st Hoogstraten
1st Surhuisterveen
 Gazet van Antwerpen
1st Rijkevorsel
1st Lille
 1st Wetzikon
2000–2001 (6)
 UCI World Cup
1st Heusden-Zolder
1st Zeddam
 Superprestige
1st Diegem
 Gazet van Antwerpen
1st Kalmthout
1st Lille
 1st Loenhout
2001–2002 (10)
 1st  Overall UCI World Cup
1st Monopoli
1st Igorre
1st Wetzikon
 1st Overall Superprestige
1st Gavere
1st Gieten
 1st Fourmies
 1st Harderwijk
 1st Oudenaarde
 1st Tábor
2002–2003 (17)
 1st  National Championships
 UCI World Cup
1st Liévin
1st Hoogerheide
 1st Overall Superprestige
1st Ruddervoorde
1st Sint-Michielsgestel
1st Gieten
1st Hoogstraten
1st Harnes
 1st Overall Gazet van Antwerpen
1st Essen
1st Loenhout
1st Baal
 1st Dottignies
 1st Fourmies
 1st Hamme
2003–2004 (10)
 UCI World Cup
1st Torino
1st Sankt-Wendel
1st Wetzikon
 Superprestige
1st Sint-Michielsgestel
1st Vorselaar
 Gazet van Antwerpen
1st Baal
 1st Eeklo
 1st Hofstade
 1st Middelkerke
2004–2005 (25)
 1st  UCI World Championships
 1st  National Championships
 1st  Overall UCI World Cup
1st Pijnacker
1st Wetzikon
1st Milan
1st Hofstade
1st Nommay
1st Hoogerheide
1st Lanarvilly
 1st Overall Superprestige
1st Ruddervoorde
1st Gavere
1st Gieten
1st Vorselaar
 1st Overall Gazet van Antwerpen
1st Oudenaarde
1st Loenhout
1st Baal
1st Lille
1st Oostmalle
 1st Aalter
 1st Erpe-Mere
 1st Huijbergen
 1st Kalmthout
 1st Overijse
 1st Woerden
2005–2006 (27)
 1st  National Championships
 1st  Overall UCI World Cup
1st Kalmthout
1st Tábor
1st Pijnacker
1st Wetzikon
1st Milan
1st Hofstade
1st Hooglede
1st Liévin
 1st Overall Superprestige
1st Hamme
1st Gavere
1st Vorselaar
 1st Overall Gazet van Antwerpen
1st Oudenaarde
1st Niel
1st Loenhout
1st Lille
 1st Aalter
 1st Antwerpen
 1st Eeklo
 1st Harderwijk
 1st Hasselt
 1st Heerlen
 1st Koksijde
 1st Lebbeke
 1st Sint-Niklaas
2006–2007 (28)
 1st  Overall UCI World Cup
1st Aigle
1st Kalmthout
1st Pijnacker
1st Koksijde
1st Igorre
1st Nommay
1st Hoogerheide
 1st Overall Superprestige
1st Ruddervoorde
1st Sint-Michielsgestel
1st Gavere
1st Gieten
1st Hamme
1st Diegem
1st Hoogstraten
1st Vorselaar
 1st Overall Gazet van Antwerpen
1st Oudenaarde
1st Essen
1st Baal
1st Lille
 1st Dottignies
 1st Eeklo
 1st Erpe-Mere
 1st Mechelen
 1st Overijse
 1st Sint-Niklaas
 1st Vossem
 1st Wachtebeke
 1st Zonhoven
2007–2008 (21)
 1st  National Championships
 UCI World Cup
1st Tábor
1st Koksijde
1st Igorre
1st Hofstade
 1st Overall Superprestige
1st Ruddervoorde
1st Hamme
1st Gavere
1st Veghel-Eerde
1st Diegem
 1st Overall Gazet van Antwerpen
1st Oudenaarde
1st Hasselt
1st Essen
1st Baal
 1st Neerpelt
 1st Harderwijk
 1st Dottignies
 1st Asteasu-Guipúzcoa
 1st Middelkerke
 1st Otegem
 1st Surhuisterveen
2008–2009 (18)
 1st  National Championships
 1st  Overall UCI World Cup
1st Kalmthout
1st Igorre
1st Milan
 1st Overall Superprestige
1st Ruddervoorde
1st Gavere
1st Hamme
 1st Overall Gazet van Antwerpen
1st Oudenaarde
1st Essen
 1st Neerpelt
 1st Dottenijs
 1st Eernegem
 1st Middelkerke
 1st Maldegem
2009–2010 (15)
 1st  National Championships
 UCI World Cup
1st Kalmthout
 Superprestige
1st Ruddervoorde
1st Gieten
1st Zonhoven
 1st Overall Gazet van Antwerpen
1st Oudenaarde
1st Loenhout
1st Baal
1st Lille
 Fidea Classics
1st Niel
 1st Woerden
 1st Middelkerke
 1st Zonnebeke
 1st Lebbeke
 1st Antwerpen
2010–2011 (14)
 1st Overall Superprestige
1st Gavere
1st Hamme
1st Hoogstraten
 Gazet van Antwerpen
1st Oudenaarde
1st Essen
1st Baal
 Fidea Classics
1st Niel
1st Neerpelt
 1st Overijse
 1st Erpe-Mere
 1st Ronse
 1st Maldegem
 1st Asteasu
 1st Lebbeke
2011–2012 (17)
 1st  National Championships
 UCI World Cup
1st Plzeň
1st Koksijde
1st Namur
 1st Overall Superprestige
1st Gieten
 Gazet van Antwerpen
1st Baal
 Fidea Classics
1st Neerpelt
1st Niel
1st Antwerpen
1st Leuven
 1st Laarne
 1st Cauberg
 1st Eeklo
 1st Overijse
2012–2013 (19)
 1st  UCI World Championships
 UCI World Cup
1st Koksijde
1st Roubaix
1st Heusden-Zolder
 1st Overall Superprestige
1st Ruddervoorde
1st Zonhoven
1st Hamme
1st Gavere
1st Hoogstraten
 Bpost Bank Trophy
1st Oudenaarde
1st Hasselt
 Soudal Classics
1st Neerpelt
 1st Kalmthout
 1st Overijse
 1st Sint-Niklaas
 1st Bredene
 1st Eeklo
 1st Lebbeke
 1st Mechelen
2013–2014 (17)
 1st  National Championships
 1st Overall Superprestige
1st Zonhoven
1st Gavere
1st Diegem
1st Hoogstraten
 1st Overall Bpost Bank Trophy
1st Ronse
1st Hasselt
1st Loenhout
1st Baal
1st Lille
 Soudal Classics
1st Leuven
1st Niel
 1st Overijse
 1st Las Vegas
 1st Zonnebeke
 1st Lebbeke
 1st Mechelen
2014–2015 (4)
 Bpost Bank Trophy
1st Ronse
 Soudal Classics
1st Neerpelt
1st Niel
 1st Las Vegas
2015–2016 (3)
 UCI World Cup
1st Koksijde
 Soudal Classics
1st Hasselt
1st Mechelen

Major championship results

UCI World Cup results

Superprestige

BPost Bank Trophy

Up until the season 2011–2012, this competition was called the Gazet van Antwerpen Trophy (GvA).

Mountain Bike

2004–2005
 1st  National Championships
2006–2007
 1st  National Championships
 1st Apeldoorn
 1st Gieten
2008–2009
 1st Averbode
2009–2010
 1st Gooik
 1st Sankt Vith
 1st Geraardsbergen
 1st Averbode
 1st Belgian Cup
2010–2011
 1st Boom
 1st Geraardsbergen
 1st Belgian Cup
2011–2012
 1st Antwerp
 1st Sankt Vith
 1st Geraardsbergen
 1st Belgian Cup
2012–2013
 1st  National Championships
2013–2014
 1st  National Championships
2014–2015
 1st  National Championships

Road

2006
 8th Overall Tour of Belgium
2007
 1st Internationale Wielertrofee Jong Maar Moedig
2008
 10th Omloop der Kempen
2011
 9th Internationale Wielertrofee Jong Maar Moedig
2012
 5th Circuit de Wallonie
2014
 6th Internationale Wielertrofee Jong Maar Moedig

References

External links
 

1976 births
Living people
Belgian male cyclists
Cyclo-cross cyclists
Cyclists at the 2008 Summer Olympics
Cyclists at the 2012 Summer Olympics
Olympic cyclists of Belgium
People from Bonheiden
UCI Cyclo-cross World Champions (men)
Cyclists at the 2015 European Games
European Games competitors for Belgium
Cyclists from Antwerp Province
Belgian cyclo-cross champions